Chen Ngo Hin (born 27 February 2003) is a Hong Kong professional footballer who currently plays as a left winger for Hong Kong Premier League club Southern, on loan from Kitchee.

Club career
On 23 September 2021, Chen was promoted to the first team of Kitchee.

On 11 August 2022, Chen was loaned to Southern until the end of the season.

Chen scored two goals against Lee Man on 5 November 2022

Career statistics

Club

Notes

References

Living people
2003 births
Hong Kong footballers
Hong Kong youth international footballers
Association football forwards
Kitchee SC players
Southern District FC players